
Gmina Słupno is a rural gmina (administrative district) in Płock County, Masovian Voivodeship, in east-central Poland. Its seat is the village of Słupno, which lies approximately 10 kilometres (6 mi) south-east of Płock and 86 km (53 mi) north-west of Warsaw.

Villages
Gmina Słupno contains the villages and settlements of Barcikowo, Bielino Wirginia, Borowiczki-Pieńki, Cekanowo, Kępa Ośnicka, Liszyno, Mijakowo, Mirosław, Miszewko Strzałkowskie, Miszewko-Stefany, Nowe Gulczewo, Ramutowo, Rydzyno, Sambórz, Słupno, Stare Gulczewo, Święcieniec, Szeligi and Wykowo.

Neighbouring gminas
Gmina Słupno is bordered by the city of Płock and by the gminas of Bodzanów, Gąbin, Radzanowo and Słubice.

References
Polish official population figures 2006

Slupno
Płock County